Everybody's Business is a 1917 British silent drama film directed by Ralph Dewsbury and starring Norman McKinnel, Gerald du Maurier and Matheson Lang.

Cast
 Norman McKinnel as John Briton  
 Gerald du Maurier as Tom Briton 
 Matheson Lang as Lieutenant Jack Goudron  
 Renee Kelly as Mabel Briton 
 Kate Rorke as Mrs. Briton  
 Gwynne Herbert as Cook  
 Edward O'Neill as Mr. Keen

References

Bibliography
 Low, Rachael. History of the British Film, 1914-1918. Routledge, 2005.

External links

1917 films
1917 drama films
British drama films
Films directed by Ralph Dewsbury
British silent short films
British black-and-white films
1910s English-language films
1910s British films
Silent drama films